Miljan Zekić was the defending champion but lost in the first round to Arthur De Greef.

Federico Delbonis won the title after defeating Marco Cecchinato 7–5, 6–1 in the final.

Seeds

Draw

Finals

Top half

Bottom half

References
Main Draw
Qualifying Draw

Internazionali di Tennis dell'Umbria - Singles
2017 Singles